This is a list of notable people who were born or who lived a significant amount of time in La Jolla, San Diego, California.

Notable residents

Sports
 Buzzie Bavasi – Major League Baseball executive, lived in La Jolla from 1968 until death in 2008
 Rolf Benirschke – placekicker for San Diego Chargers, graduated from La Jolla High School
 Dan Bilzerian – professional poker player, lives in La Jolla
 Debbie Bramwell-Washington – IFBB professional bodybuilder
 Chase Budinger – NBA player for Minnesota Timberwolves, born in La Jolla
 Conor Chinn – professional soccer player for New York Red Bulls, born in La Jolla
 Jonathan Compas – former center for Tampa Bay Buccaneers, other NFL teams, and member of the Boston Fitzgibbon family. 
 Gerry Driscoll – championship sailor, businessperson, lived in La Jolla until death in 2011
 Dick Enberg – sportscaster for NBC and CBS Sports, resided in La Jolla
 Doug Flutie – quarterback for San Diego Chargers and other NFL teams
 J. J. Isler – yachtswoman, two-time Olympic medalist and America's Cup competitor, born in La Jolla
 Gene Littler – professional golfer, 1961 U.S. Open champion, graduated from La Jolla High School
 John Michels – played for Super Bowl XXXI champion Green Bay Packers, born and raised in La Jolla
 Rey Mysterio – World Wrestling Entertainment (WWE) professional wrestler
 Jo Anne Overleese, M.D. – one of few doctors to have played in All-American Girls Professional Baseball League history, born in La Jolla
 Gabrielle Reece – volleyball player, fashion model, and television celebrity, born in La Jolla
 Xander Schauffele – professional golfer, 2017 Tour Championship winner, born in La Jolla
 Junior Seau – linebacker for San Diego Chargers and other NFL teams, lived in La Jolla
 Bob Skinner – Major League Baseball player, coach, manager, scout, born in La Jolla
 Joel Skinner – manager and third base coach of Major League Baseball's Cleveland Indians, born in La Jolla
 Craig Stadler – professional golfer, graduated from La Jolla High School in 1971
 Alexandra Stevenson – professional tennis player and 1999 semi-finalist at Wimbledon, born in La Jolla
 Lou Thesz (1916–2002) – professional wrestler
 Bradley Zimmer – outfielder for MLB's Cleveland Indians, born in La Jolla

Arts and entertainment

Actors and actresses
 Gary Erwin – TV personality and member of docu-series, Addicted to Beauty, which aired on the Oxygen (TV channel)
 Shane Harper – actor and musician
 Charlotte Henry – actress
 Izetta Jewel – stage actress, women's rights activist and local radio personality
 James Maslow – actor, songwriter and singer
 Danica McKellar – actress
 Zoe McLellan – actress
 Gregory Peck – actor, born in La Jolla
 Autumn Reeser – actress (The O.C.), born in La Jolla and lived there until age 17
 Cliff Robertson – actor, born in La Jolla, attended La Jolla High School
 Raquel Welch – actress, attended La Jolla High School
 Robin Wright – actress, attended La Jolla High School
 Shay Rudolph - actress and social media personality

Film and television executives
 Donald De Line – studio executive and film producer (Pretty Woman) at Walt Disney Productions and its Touchstone Pictures division since 1985, native La Jollan
 Ellen Goldsmith-Vein – producer of "The Maze Runner" Trilogy among other notable motion pictures and television series, attended La Jolla High School.
 Gore Verbinski – director of Pirates of the Caribbean, attended La Jolla High School

Writers
 Tucker Carlson – political commentator, journalist, writer, television talk show host, raised in La Jolla, attended La Jolla Country Day
 Raymond Chandler – noir novelist, moved to La Jolla and uttered the aphorism about La Jolla, "A nice place — for old people and their parents"
 Deepak Chopra – spiritual writer, ran his Center for Well Being in La Jolla until recently 
 Peter Economy – author, editor, ghostwriter, and publishing consultant
 Debbie Ford – self-help author of best-selling The Dark Side of the Light Chasers (1998)
 Theodor "Dr. Seuss" Geisel – children's author, long-time resident of La Jolla, namesake of the Geisel Library at the University of California, San Diego
 Audrey Geisel – Dr. Seuss' widow
 Udo Keppler – American political cartoonist, publisher, Native American advocate, contributor to Judge and Leslie's Weekly magazines, and son of cartoonist Joseph Keppler who founded Puck magazine.
 Anne Rice – novelist and author of Interview with the Vampire, moved to La Jolla from New Orleans in March 2005
 Alan Russell – best-selling mystery and crime novelist, attended La Jolla High School

Music
 J. J. Cale – singer-songwriter and guitarist, lived and died in La Jolla
 Robbin Crosby – rock musician who played electric guitar for the metal band Ratt, born and attended high school in La Jolla
 Warren DeMartini – rock musician who plays electric guitar for the metal band Ratt, attended high school in La Jolla
 Michael Franks – musician, singer and recording artist, born in La Jolla
 Amelita Galli-Curci – Italian operatic coloratura soprano, lived and died in La Jolla
 Sam Hinton – folk singer and marine biologist
 Andy Skib – guitarist and keyboardist in David Cook's band
 Alicia Keys – pianist and singer-songwriter

Visual and performance art
 Armi Kuusela – winner of the first Miss Universe beauty pageant in 1952, lives in La Jolla with her husband, Albert Williams

Crime
 Ivan Boesky – financier convicted of insider trading, lives in La Jolla with his second wife, Ana Boesky, and their child
 Betty Broderick – convicted of second degree murder, lived in La Jolla, found guilty on December 11, 1991, and sentenced to 32 years to life in prison for the murders of ex-husband Dan Broderick and his second wife, Linda Kolkena
 Andrew Cunanan – infamous spree killer of Gianni Versace and three others, graduated from The Bishop's School in 1987

Government and politics
 Richard Goodwin Capen Jr. – former United States Ambassador to Spain, chairman of Miami Herald and vice chairman of Knight Ridder, a longtime resident of La Jolla.
David Hall – former Governor of Oklahoma, moved to La Jolla following his release from federal prison with his wife, former Oklahoma First Lady Jo Evans Hall; died 2016 
 Hyrum Rex Lee – former American Samoa Governor; lived with his wife, First Lady Lillian Lee, in a $5 million high-rise condo in the Shore Towers until their deaths in 2001 and 2010, respectively.
 John McCain – United States Senator from Arizona, 2008 Presidential nominee of the Republican Party, owned a home in La Jolla with his wife, Cindy McCain
Geoffrey R. Pyatt – United States Ambassador to Ukraine, born in La Jolla in 1963
 Mitt Romney – former Governor of Massachusetts and the Republican nominee for the 2012 presidential election, and his wife, former Massachusetts First Lady Ann Romney, purchased a $12 million vacation home in La Jolla in 2008

Business and finance
 David C. Copley – former owner of The San Diego Union-Tribune and member of the Forbes 400 until his death in 2012
 Benjamin Graham – economist and value investor, lived in La Jolla at the end of his life
 Trip Hawkins – 64th employee at Apple Computer and founder of Electronic Arts, The 3DO Company and Digital Chocolate, graduated from Muirlands Junior High and La Jolla High School
 Irwin Mark Jacobs – electrical engineer, co-founder and chairman of the board of Qualcomm
 William Lerach – securities lawyer whose cases include Enron
Joseph Tsai – founder of Alibaba Group
 Ted Waitt – founder of Gateway, Inc.

Science and technology
 Geoffrey Burbidge and Margaret Burbidge – astronomers holding positions at UCSD after many years, reside near La Jolla Shores
 Francis Crick – Nobel Prize in medicine winner for his work to identify the essential structure of DNA, long-time resident of La Jolla
 Hillman Curtis – web designer
 Lawrence J. Fogel – inventor of active noise cancellation, studied artificial intelligence, long-time resident of La Jolla
 Robert Galambos – researcher who discovered how bats use echolocation
 Ronald Lewis Graham – mathematician, lived and died in La Jolla
 Clive Granger – 2003 Nobel Prize in Economics winner; long-time resident of La Jolla
Augustus Braun Kinzel - metallurgist, President and CEO of Salk Institute, Union Carbide VP, founding President of the National Academy of Engineering, and consultant to the Manhattan Project in Los Alamos, lived in La Jolla from 1957 - 1986 (death)
 Kary Mullis – Nobel Prize in Chemistry-winning biochemist and surfer from La Jolla, invented the polymerase chain reaction (PCR) method of DNA analysis
 Walter Munk – oceanographer, lived in La Jolla
 Leslie Orgel – research chemist, lived in La Jolla from 1964 to 2007
 Sally Ride – astronaut, lived and died in La Jolla
 Carl Rogers – psychologist and researcher of psychotherapy
 Jonas Salk – virologist and founder of Salk Institute for Biological Studies in La Jolla who developed the first successful inactivated polio vaccine
 Ellen Browning Scripps – philanthropist, founder of Scripps Institute of Oceanography and Scripps College, member of the Forbes 400
 K. Barry Sharpless – Nobel Prize in Chemistry winner, lives in La Jolla
 Benjamin Elazari Volcani – microbiologist

References

La Jolla

People from La Jolla
La Jolla